Pike, Pikes or The Pike may refer to:

Fish
 Blue pike or blue walleye, an extinct color morph of the yellow walleye Sander vitreus
 Ctenoluciidae, the "pike characins", some species of which are commonly known as pikes
 Esox, genus of pikes
 Northern pike, common northern hemisphere pike
 Mackerel pike or Pacific saury, a fish popular in east Asian cuisine
 Walleyed pike or walleye, Sander vitreus, not actually a pike, but regionally referred to as such

Places

Russia
 Shchukino District (Russian for "Pike" District), an area in North-Western Administrative Okrug, part of the federal city of Moscow.

Canada
 Pike Island (Nunavut)
 Pike River (Quebec)

Great Britain
 Clougha Pike, a hill in Lancashire, England
 Cold Pike, a fell in the Lake District, England
 Dollywaggon Pike, a fell in the Lake District, England
 Esk Pike, a fell in the Lake District, England
 Hartshead Pike, a hill in Lancashire, England
 The Langdale Pikes, a range of hills in the Lake District, England
 Murton Pike, a hill in Cumbria, England
 Nethermost Pike, a fell in the Lake District, England
 Pikes (hill), a hill in the Lake District, England
 Red Pike (Buttermere), a fell near Buttermere in the Lake District, England
 Red Pike (Wasdale), a fell near Wasdale in the Lake District, England
 Scafell Pike, the highest mountain in England
 The Pike (Hesk Fell), one of Wainwright's outlying fells in the Lake District, England

United States
 Pike, California, a census-designated place
 Pike, Indiana, an unincorporated community
 Pikeville, Kentucky
 Pike, New Hampshire, an unincorporated community
 Pike, New York, a town
 Pike (CDP), New York, hamlet in the town of Pike
 Pike, Texas, an unincorporated community
 Pike, West Virginia
 Pike Bay Township, Cass County, Minnesota
 Pike Island, Minnesota
 Pike National Forest, Colorado
 Pike Place Market, Seattle, Washington
 Pike Road, Alabama
 Pikes Peak, in Colorado
 The Pike, an amusement park in California
 Pike County, Alabama
 Pike County, Arkansas
 Pike County, Georgia
 Pike County, Illinois
 Pike County, Indiana
 Pike County, Kentucky
 Pike County, Mississippi
 Pike County, Missouri
 Pike County, Ohio
 Pike County, Pennsylvania

Multiple entities
 Pike County (disambiguation)
 Pike Township (disambiguation)

Military
 Pike (weapon), a long thrusting pole weapon used by infantry
 Pike square, a Swiss military tactic
 HMS Pike, the name of five ships of the Royal Navy
 USS Pike (SS-6), an American Plunger-class submarine
 USS Pike (SS-173), the first all-welded submarine
 Pike (munition), a Raytheon-developed guided round fired from a grenade launcher

Music
 Pikes (album), released by Buckethead in 2013
 The Northern Pikes, a Canadian rock band, from Saskatoon

Sports
 Pike (diving), a position used in competitive diving
 Pike (gymnastics), a position in which the body is bent only in the hips
 Pike, a variant of the kick (b-boy move)
 Pike, a type of cheerleading jump

Technology
Pike (cipher), a stream cipher invented by Ross Anderson
Pike (programming language), a programming language
Red Pike (cipher), a British government cipher

Characters 
 Pike Trickfoot, a gnome cleric in the D&D Web Series Critical Role
 Pike (Buffyverse character), a minor character in Buffy the Vampire Slayer
 Pike, a racer character in Rimba Racer
 Langdale Pike, a minor character in The Adventure of the Three Gables, a Sherlock Holmes story by Sir Arthur Conan Doyle
 Private Frank Pike Character in UK TV show Dad's Army
 Captain Christopher Pike (Star Trek), a character in the Star Trek science fiction franchise.

Other uses 
 Pike (surname), a list of people
 Pike Expedition, an American exploration of the Great Plains and Rocky Mountains
 Pike pole, a long-handled reaching, holding, and pulling tool
 Pike potato, a variety of potato
 The Pike: Gabriele D'Annunzio, Poet, Seducer and Preacher of War, 2009 biography
 Pike or toll road, a road on which fees are collected
 Massachusetts Turnpike, known as "The Pike"
 Pike, a colloquial name for the Pi Kappa Alpha fraternity
 WWFX, branded as "100 FM The Pike"

See also
 Pike Creek (disambiguation)
 Piker (disambiguation)
 Pikes Peak (disambiguation)
 Pyke (disambiguation)